Mike Stone may refer to:

Mike Stone (baseball) (born 1955), American college baseball coach
Mike Stone (British Army officer) (born 1953), chief information officer of the British Ministry of Defence
Mike Stone (karate) (born 1944), American martial arts competitor and actor
Mike Stone (lacrosse) (born 1986), current player for the Boston Cannons
Mike Stone (musician) (born 1969), former guitarist for the progressive metal band Queensrÿche
Mike Stone (radio personality) (born 1958), sports radio broadcaster in Detroit, Michigan, USA
Mike C. Stone (born 1970), American businessman and politician from North Carolina
Mike Stone (record producer) (1951–2002), English recording engineer and record producer
Mike D. Stone (1949–2017), American recording engineer
Mike Stone, founder of independent record label Clay Records, Stoke-on-Trent
Mike Stone (character), lead character of The Streets of San Francisco

See also
Michael Stone (disambiguation)